Sir Andrew Agnew, 2nd Baronet (died 1671) was a Scottish parliamentary shire commissioner for Wigtownshire and Sheriff of Kirkcudbright.

Succession
He was the son of Sir Patrick Agnew, 1st Baronet and Margaret Kennedy.

He succeeded his father as 2nd Baronet Agnew, of Lochnaw on the latter's death in 1661. On his death in 1671 he was succeeded in the baronetcy by his eldest son.

Career
He was shire commissioner for Wigtownshire in the Parliament of Scotland in 1644, 1647, 1665, 1667 and 1669. He was Sheriff of Wigtown and Kirkcudbright during the Interregnum in 1656. He was later fined £6000 for his support of Oliver Cromwell.

Family
He married Lady Anne Stewart, daughter of Alexander Stewart, 1st Earl of Galloway and Grizel Gordon (1625), and had issue:
Sir Andrew Agnew, 3rd Baronet (d. c1702)
William Agnew, 3rd of Wigg
Grizel Agnew, married Hugh Cathcart (1650)
Margaret Agnew, married John Maxwell (1656), and later Rev. Walter Laurie

External links
ThePeerage.com

1671 deaths
Baronets in the Baronetage of Nova Scotia
Shire Commissioners to the Parliament of Scotland
Members of the Parliament of Scotland 1644–1647
Members of the Parliament of Scotland 1648–1651
Members of the Convention of the Estates of Scotland 1665
Members of the Convention of the Estates of Scotland 1667
Members of the Parliament of Scotland 1669–1674
Year of birth missing
Scottish sheriffs